The Priory Gatehouse in Usk, Monmouthshire, Wales, is a surviving fragment of a Benedictine priory founded around 1135 and dissolved in 1536.  It stands beside the main entrance to the churchyard. It is a Grade I listed building.

The gatehouse is of two storeys, with gables and wide inner and outer arches. The style of the windows suggests a "sixteenth century date, possibly even post-Dissolution".

Notes

References 
 

History of Monmouthshire
Buildings and structures in Monmouthshire
Grade I listed buildings in Monmouthshire
Scheduled monuments in Monmouthshire
Gatehouses (architecture)
Usk